Al Faisal Tower is a 54-storey office building on the Conference street, Doha, Qatar. It was begun in 2008 and completed in 2011. Al Faisal Tower is situated in Doha’s business district.

References 

Doha
Skyscrapers in Doha
Skyscraper office buildings
Office buildings completed in 2011